Nangarhar can mean:

Nangarhar Province, a province of Afghanistan
Nangarhar University, a university  in Jalalabad, Afghanistan
Nangarhar Provincial Museum, a museum in Hadda, Afghanistan
"Nangarhar Killings" is another name for the 2007 Shinwar shooting